The population estimates for cities in South Sudan are for 2010, except where otherwise indicated. The references from which the estimated populations are sourced are listed in each article for the cities where the population estimates are given. This list is not comprehensive.

* The status of Abyei is contested as of the date of South Sudanese independence – 9 July 2011.

See also
States of South Sudan
List of cities in Sudan
 List of cities in East Africa

References

 
South Sudan
Cities
Subdivisions of South Sudan